The U.S.–Japan Caucus is a bipartisan Congressional Member Organization within the United States Congress made up of over 100 members of the United States House of Representatives who work to strengthen and maintain U.S.–Japanese Relations.

Mission and purpose

According to the caucus's website, its goal is to "...facilitate bilateral collaboration on matters of common interest between our two countries, including trade, foreign direct investment, regional stability, military cooperation, energy, technological development, and the environment. The caucus collaborates with other entities and stakeholders that share this same objective."

History
In January 2014, Congressmen Joaquin Castro (D-TX) and Devin Nunes (R-CA) began inviting members of Congress from both parties to join a Congressional Member Organization based on the improvement of U.S.–Japanese relations. 

The formation of the caucus was officially announced on March 24, 2014, during a live press conference.  During the conference, Rep. Castro gave the following statement on behalf of the caucus:

In January 2015, after Rep. Devin Nunes became the Chairman of the House Intelligence Committee, he stepped down from his role within the caucus as its Republican Co-Chair.  Nunes was replaced by then Rep. Charles Boustany (LA-3).  On March 23, 2016, Boustany stepped down as co-chair of the caucus.  He was replaced by Rep. David Reichart (WA-8).  Reichart, to date, is the current Republican Co-Chair.

Membership
As of the 117th Congress, the U.S.–Japan Caucus has 75 members. Below the leadership, caucus members are listed alphabetically.

Current members

 Rep. Joaquin Castro (TX-20)- Co-Chair
 Rep. Adrian Smith (NE-3)- Co-Chair
 Rep. Mark Amodei (NV-2)
 Rep. Andy Barr (KY-6)
 Rep. Ami Bera (CA-7)
 Rep. Jack Bergman (MI-1)
 Rep. Don Beyer (VA-8)
 Rep. Sanford Bishop (GA-2)
 Rep. Earl Blumenauer (OR-3)
 Rep. Anthony Brown (MD-4) Retiring at end of 117th Congress.
 Rep. Buddy Carter (GA-1)
 Rep. Steve Chabot (OH-1)
 Rep. Steve Cohen (TN-9)
 Rep. Gerry Connolly (VA-11)
 Rep. Jim Cooper (TN-5) Retiring at end of 117th Congress due to redistricting.
 Rep. Charlie Crist (FL-13) Retiring at end of 117th Congress.
 Rep. Henry Cuellar (TX-28)
 Rep. Suzan DelBene (WA-1)
 Rep. Drew Ferguson (GA-3)
 Rep. Chuck Fleischmann (TN-3)
 Rep. Bill Foster (IL-11)
 Rep. Lois Frankel (FL-21)
 Rep. Mike Gallagher (WI-8)
 Rep. Paul Gosar (AZ-4)
 Rep. Kay Granger (TX-12)
 Rep. Al Green (TX-9)
 Rep. Brett Guthrie (KY-2)
 Rep. J. French Hill (AR-2)
 Rep. Jim Himes (CT-4)
 Rep. Sheila Jackson Lee (TX-18)
 Rep. Hakeem Jeffries (NY-8)
 Rep. Eddie Bernice Johnson (TX-30) Retiring at end of 117th Congress.
 Rep. Hank Johnson (GA-4)
 Rep. Jim Jordan (OH-4)
 Rep. Bill Keating (MA-9)
 Rep. Derek Kilmer (WA-6)
 Rep. Ron Kind (WI-3) Retiring at end of 117th Congress.
 Rep. Doug LaMalfa (CA-1)
 Rep. Doug Lamborn (CO-5)
 Rep. Rick Larsen (WA-2)
 Rep. Brenda Lawrence (MI-14) Retiring at end of 117th Congress.
 Rep. Ted Lieu (CA-33)
 Rep. Billy Long (MO-7) Retiring at end of 117th Congress.
 Rep. Barry Loudermilk (GA-11)
 Rep. Carolyn Maloney (NY-12)
 Rep. Gregory Meeks (NY-5)
 Rep. Carol Miller (WV-3)
 Rep. John Moolenaar (MI-4)
 Rep. Richard Neal (MA-1)
 Rep. Dan Newhouse (WA-4)
 Rep. Eleanor Holmes Norton (DC-At large)
 Rep. Steven Palazzo (MS-4) Lost renomination in 2022.
 Rep. Bill Pascrell (NJ-9)
 Rep. Ed Perlmutter (CO-7) Retiring at end of 117th Congress.
 Rep. Scott Peters (CA-52)
 Rep. Mike Quigley (Il-5)
 Rep. Kathleen Rice (NY-4) Retiring at end of 117th Congress.
 Rep. Dutch Ruppersberger (MD-2)
 Rep. Gregorio Sablan (NMI-At large)
 Rep. David Schweikert (AZ-6)
 Rep. David Scott (GA-13)
 Rep. Adam Smith (WA-9)
 Rep. Jason Smith (MO-8)
 Rep. Darren Soto (FL-9)
 Rep. Jackie Speier (CA-14) Retiring at end of 117th Congress.
 Rep. Chris Stewart (UT-2)
 Rep. Steve Stivers (OH-15)
 Rep. Mark Takano (CA-41)
 Rep. Mike Thompson
 Rep. Pat Tiberi (OH-12)
 Rep. Dina Titus (NV-1)
 Rep. Marc Veasey (TX-33)
 Rep. Randy Weber (TX-14)
 Rep. Bruce Westerman (AK-4)

Former members
 Rep. Cynthia Lummis (WY-At large)- Announced she would not seek re-election in 2016.
 Rep. Randy Forbes (VA-4)- Defeated in the 2016 Republican primary.
 Rep. Brad Ashford (NE-2)- Defeated in the 2016 general election.
 Rep. Charles Boustany (LA-3)- Gave up his seat to run for the Louisiana Senate in 2016. Was defeated in the general election.
 Rep. Janice Hahn (CA-44)- Retired from Congress in 2016 to successfully run for the Los Angeles County Board of Supervisors
 Rep. Richard L. Hanna (NY-22)- Announced he would not seek re-election in 2016.
 Sen. Chris Van Hollen (D-MD)- Retired from Congress in 2016 to successfully run for Maryland's open Senate seat.
 Sen. Todd Young (R-IN)- Retired from Congress in 2016 to successfully run for Indiana's open Senate seat.
 Rep. Ryan Zinke (MT-At large)- Nominated by Donald Trump to be the 52nd United States Secretary of the Interior in 2017.
 Rep. Charlie Dent (PA-15)- Resigned from Congress in May 2018.
 Rep. Diane Black (TN-6)- Retired from Congress in 2018 to run unsuccessfully for Governor of Tennessee.
Rep. Madeleine Bordallo (Guam-At large) Defeated in the 2018 Democratic primary.
Rep. Mike Capuano (MA-7)- Defeated in the 2018 Democratic primary.
Rep. Carlos Curbelo (FL-26)- Defeated in 2018 general election.
Rep. Jeff Denham (CA-10)- Defeated in 2018 general election.
Rep. Jimmy Duncan (politician) (TN-2)- Retired from Congress in 2018.
Rep. Gene Green (TX-29)- Retired from Congress in 2018.
Rep. Gregg Harper (MS-3)-Retired from Congress in 2018.
Rep. Tom MacArthur (NJ-3)- Defeated in the 2018 general election.
Rep. Jared Polis (CO-2)- Retired from Congress in 2018 to successfully run for Governor in Colorado.
Rep. Robert Pittenger (NC-9)- Defeated in the 2018 Republican primary.
Rep. Tom Rooney (FL-17)- Retired from Congress in 2018.
Rep. Dennis Ross (FL-15)- Retired from Congress in 2018.
Rep. Niki Tsongas (MA-3)- Retired from Congress in 2018.
Rep. Kevin Yoder (KS-3)- Defeated in 2018 general election. 
Rep. Tulsi Gabbard (HI-2) Retired from Congress in 2020 to unsuccessfully run for in the Democratic primary for the 2020 United States presidential election.
Rep. Ralph Abraham (LA-5)- Announced he would not seek re-election in 2020
Rep. Mark Meadows (NC-11)- Resigned from Congress to become White House chief of staff.
Rep. Eliot Engel (NY-16)- Defeated in the 2020 Democratic primary.
Rep. Denny Heck (WA-10)- Retired from Congress in 2020 to run successfully for Lieutenant Governor in Washington State.
Rep. George Holding (NC-2)- Retired from Congress in 2020 due to court-ordered redistricting.
 Rep. Joe Kennedy (MA-4)- Retired from Congress in 2020 to unsuccessfully challenge incumbent Ed Markey in the Democratic Primary for Senate in Massachusetts.
 Rep. Doug Collins (GA-9)- Retired from Congress in 2020 to unsuccessfully run in the United States Senate special election in Georgia.
 Rep. Kenny Marchant (TX-24)- Retired from Congress in 2020.
 Rep. Jim Sensenbrenner (WI-5)- Retired from Congress in 2020.
 Rep. Pete Visclosky (IN-1)- Retired from Congress in 2020.
 Rep. Susan Davis (CA-53)- Retired from Congress in 2020.
 Rep. Alcee Hastings (FL-20)-Died in April 2021.
 Rep. Devin Nunes (CA-22)- Resigned January 2022 to become Chief Executive Officer of the Trump Media & Technology Group (TMTG).
 Rep. Filemon Vela Jr. (TX-34)- Resigned March 2022 to work at Akin Gump.
 Rep. Jackie Walorski (IN-2)- Killed in car crash along with two staffers in August 2022.

Political activity
Since the founding of the caucus, it and its members have repeatedly voiced their opinions on various issues surrounding Japanese foreign relations, as well as worked to pass legislation that would benefit U.S.–Japanese relations.

Visit to Japan

From August 23 to August 28, 2015, Rep. Joaquin Castro, then Co-Chair of the U.S.–Japan Caucus, visited Japan for five days as an official representative of the United States and the U.S.–Japan Caucus.  While there, he met with various officials within the Japanese Government, including, Shinzo Abe (The Prime Minister of Japan), Caroline Kennedy (the then-U.S. Ambassador to Japan), Yoichi Miyazawa (Then Japanese Minister of Economy, Trade, and Industry), as well as the members of the Japanese-US Parliamentary Friendship League (the Japanese counterpart of the U.S.–Japan Caucus).

Japanese comfort women
On January 12, 2016, the U.S.–Japan Caucus came out in support of a historic agreement between Japan and South Korea surrounding the controversial issue of Japanese comfort women.  The caucus released the following statement:

November 2017 North Korean missile test
On November 28, 2017, North Korea launched a Hwasong-15 ballistic missile into the Sea of Japan, which landed near Japan's Exclusive Economic Zone.  In response, the U.S.–Japan Caucus, consisting of members from both political parties, issued the following statement:

References

Caucuses of the United States Congress
Japan–United States relations
2014 establishments in the United States